The Rax is a mountain range in the Northern Limestone Alps on the border of the Austrian federal provinces of Lower Austria and Styria. Its highest peak is the Heukuppe (2,007 m). The Rax, together with the nearby Schneeberg, are a traditional mountaineering and mountain walking area, and are called the Wiener Hausberge (Vienna's local mountains). They are separated by the deep Höllental ("Hell Valley").

A cable car, the Raxseilbahn, starting at Hirschwang at the north-eastern foot of the mountains and the first in Austria (construction began in 1925), takes visitors to the extensive, high plateau of the Rax at a height of about 1,500 m. This area is a particular favourite with hikers from Lower Austria and Vienna. The steep sides of the plateau offer climbing tours of various difficulty. These steige (mountain trails) and the hütten, alpine huts offering basic accommodation, were built and are maintained kept by various Austrian Alpine Clubs. They were erected in the late 19th and early 20th century.

Mountain huts

 Raxseilbahn mountain station, 1,540 m
 Ottohaus, 1,640 m
 Gloggnitzer Hut, 1,548 m
 Habsburg Haus, 1,785 m
 Karl Ludwig Haus, 1,804 m
 See Hut, 1,643 m
 Waxriegelhaus 1,361 m
 Wolfgang Dirnbacher Hut, 1,477 m (shelter only)

Some Hikes and Rises

 Alpenvereins Steig: Großes Höllental – Ottohaus
 Amaliensteig: Preiner Gscheid – Heukuppe
 Bärenloch: Hinternasswald – Bärengraben
 Bismarck Steig: Karl Ludwig Haus – Neue Seehütte
 Brandschneide: Kaiserbrunn – Bergstation Raxbahn
 Großes und kleines Fuchsloch: Preiner Gscheid – Heukuppe
 Gaislochsteig (former Guido von List Steig): Großes Höllental – Dirnbacher Hütte
 Göbl-Kühn-Steig: Waxriegelhaus – Neue Seehütte
 Gamsecksteig: Nasskamm – Grasboden Alm
 Gretchen Steig: Preiner Gscheid – Karl Ludwig Haus
 Grosses Wolfstal (unmarkiert, Schiabfahrt!) Kaiserbrunn – Ottohaus
 Grosser Kesselgraben (Schiabfahrt!) Höllental – Gloggnitzer Hütte
 Gsolhirnsteig
 Gustav-Jahn-Steig: Verbindung Alpenvereinssteig – Ausstieg Gaislochsteig
 Hans-von-Haid-Steig: Prein an der Rax – Preiner Wand
 Hoyossteig: Großes Höllental – Rudolfsteig
 Kaiser Steig: Rehboden – Scheibwald
 Karl-Kantner-Steig: Waxriegelhaus – Karl Ludwig Haus
 Kontrußsteig: Reißtalerhütte – Waxriegelhaus
 Peter Jokl Steig: Hinternasswald – Scheibwald
 Preinerwandsteig: Prein an der Rax – Preiner Wand
 Preintalersteig: Großes Höllental – Wachthüttelkamm
 Reißtalersteig: Preiner Gscheid – Heukuppe
 Rudolfssteig: Höllental – Klobentörl
 Schlangenweg: Waxriegelhaus – Karl Ludwig Haus
 Schüttersteig: Verbindungsstrasse Nasswald/Hinternasswald – Scheibwald
 Seeweg: Ottohaus – Neue Seehütte
 Teufelsbadstubensteig: Großes Höllental – Wachthüttelkamm
 Törlweg: Knappenhof – Ottohaus
 Wachthüttelkamm: Höllental – Ottohaus
 Waxriegelsteig: Predigtstuhl – Waxriegelhaus
 Wildes Gamseck: Nasskamm – Grasboden Alm
 Wildfährte: Hinternasswald – Grasboden Alm
 Zikafahnlsteig: Scheibwald – Habsburghaus

Mountain ranges of the Alps
Northern Limestone Alps
Mountain ranges of Lower Austria
Rax-Schneeberg Group
Two-thousanders of Austria